The 2004 Sun Bowl featured the Arizona State Sun Devils, and the Purdue Boilermakers. Sponsored by the Vitalis brand of hair tonic made by Bristol-Myers, the game was officially known as the Vitalis Sun Bowl. It was the 71st Sun Bowl.

Arizona State's place kicker, Jessie Ainsworth kicked a 22-yard field goal in the first quarter to give the Sun Devils a 3-0 lead. Arizona State's running back, Preston Jones was tackled in the end zone by Purdue's Brandon Villareal, for a safety, putting Purdue on the board 3-2. The defenses held, and that score held up in the locker room.

In the third quarter, Purdue's Kyle Orton connected with wide receiver Brian Hare for a long 80-yard touchdown pass to give Purdue a 9-3 lead. Arizona State quarterback, Sam Keller found Derek Hagan in the end zone for a 27-yard touchdown to put Arizona State back on top 10-9. He finished the game with 370 yards passing.

Early in the fourth quarter, Orton found all-American Taylor Stubblefield for a 5-yard touchdown pass, reclaiming the lead for Purdue, 16-10. Arizona State moved the ball on their ensuing drive, but it stalled, and they had to settle for a field goal. Ainsworth connected on a 34-yard field goal, trimming the margin to 16-13. Keller later threw to Rudy Burgess for a 41-yard touchdown, giving ASU a 20-16 lead.

Purdue reclaimed the lead with a 6-yard touchdown pass from Orton to Charles Davis giving them a 23-20 lead. Sam Keller's final touchdown to Rudy Burgess proved to be the game winner, as ASU held off Purdue by a 27-23 margin.

Grammy-winning Texas band Los Lonely Boys performed at halftime.

References

External links
USA Today recap of game

Sun Bowl
Sun Bowl
Arizona State Sun Devils football bowl games
Purdue Boilermakers football bowl games
Sun Bowl
December 2004 sports events in the United States